Minhas Canções na Voz de Fernandes Lima, Vol. 2 (My Songs in the Voice of Fernandes Lima, Vol. 2) is the sixth album by the Brazilian singer Fernandes Lima. The album was released on September 20, 2012 by Graça Music, and sold 100,000 copies in Brazil.

Track listing

References 

2012 albums